A list of films produced by the Hindi films released in 1969:

Top-grossing films
The top-grossing films at the Indian Box Office in 
1969:

A-C

D-J

K-N

O-R

S-Z

References

1969
Bollywood
Films, Bollywood